Dressed for the Occasion is an album by English singer Cliff Richard, recorded live with the accompaniment of the London Philharmonic Orchestra at the Royal Albert Hall in November 1982. It was released in May 1983 on the EMI label and reached No. 7 in the UK Albums Chart and No. 30 in Australia. It was certified Silver in the UK.
 
"True Love Ways", a cover of the Buddy Holly original, was released in April 1983 as the lead single from the album and reached No. 8 on the UK Singles Chart. No further singles were released from the album, however the album includes covers of two additional hit songs, being "Softly, as I Leave You", of which the original English version by Matt Monro reached No. 10 in the UK Singles Chart in 1962; the other being "The Treasure of Love", of which Clyde McPhatter's original in 1956 reached No. 1 on the US Billboard Rhythm and Blues Chart and No. 22 on the Billboard Top 100, but only No. 27 in the UK Singles Chart.

The album also includes orchestral versions of several of Richard's hits since his 1976 renaissance, "Miss You Nights", "Devil Woman", "Green Light", "We Don't Talk Anymore" and "Carrie".

Track listing

Side one
"Green Light" (Alan Tarney) – 4:11
"We Don't Talk Anymore" (Alan Tarney) – 4:34
"True Love Ways" (Buddy Holly, Norman Petty) – 3:11
"Softly, as I Leave You" (Giorgio Calabrese, Tony De Vita, Hal Shaper) – 3:28
"Carrie" (Terry Britten, B.A. Robertson) – 3:25
"Miss You Nights" (Dave Townsend) – 4:04

Side two
"Galadriel (Spirit of Starlight)" (Hank Marvin, John Farrar) – 5:36
"Maybe Someday" (Dean Klevatt, Karel Fialka) – 3:31
"Thief in the Night" (Paul Field) – 4:07
"Up in the World" (Clifford T. Ward) – 2:40
"The Treasure of Love" (Joe Shapiro, Lou Stallman) – 2:02
"Devil Woman" (Terry Britten, Christine Holmes) – 4:36

Additional (previously unreleased) live tracks from the concert (2004 re-issue):
 "The Golden Days are Over" (Terry Britten, Sue Shifrin) – 4:04
 "You, Me and Jesus" (Cliff Richard) – 2:06
 "Discovering" (Chris Eaton) – 3:40
 "Daddy's Home (James Sheppard, William H. Miller) – 2:40
 "Little Town" (Chris Eaton) – 3:50

Personnel
Cliff Richard – lead and backing vocals
London Philharmonic Orchestra conducted by Richard Hewson
David Cooke – synthesizer
Mark Griffith – bass guitar
Graham Jarvis – drums
 Steve Gray – piano
Tony Rivers – backing vocals
Tony Harding – backing vocals
Stu Calver – backing vocals
John Perry – backing vocals

Technical personnel
Producers – Cliff Richard and Richard Hewson
Conductor – Richard Hewson
Arrangement – Richard Hewson
Engineer – John Kurlander
Mixing – Keith Bessey (at Strawberry Studios South)
Recording – Doug Hopkins (using Pumacrest Mobile)

Credits adapted from the album's liner notes and the book Cliff Richard – The Complete Recording Sessions 1958–1990.

Charts and certifications

Charts

Certifications

References

External links 
 AllMusic review of Dressed for the Occasion

1983 live albums
Cliff Richard albums
EMI Records live albums
London Philharmonic Orchestra albums
Live albums recorded at the Royal Albert Hall